"It Won't Hurt" is a song written and recorded by American country music artist Dwight Yoakam.  It was released in November 1986 as the third and final single from his debut album Guitars, Cadillacs, Etc., Etc..  While it missed the top 30 on the Billboard Hot Country Songs chart, it became a top ten hit in Canada, peaking at number 7 on the Canadian RPM country singles chart. The song can be heard during the outro to Yoakam's music video for "Honky-Tonk Man".

Critical reception
Larry Flick, of Billboard magazine reviewed the song favorably, calling it a "classic hurtin' and drinkin' song convincingly sung."

Chart performance
"It Won't Hurt" debuted at number 64 on the U.S. Billboard Hot Country Singles & Tracks for the week of November 15, 1986.

Demo Version
A demo version of the song can be found on Yoakam's 2002 boxed set, Reprise Please, Baby, as well as his 2006 reissue of "Guitars, Cadillacs, Etc., Etc."

References

1986 singles
1986 songs
Dwight Yoakam songs
Songs written by Dwight Yoakam
Reprise Records singles
Song recordings produced by Pete Anderson